Jon Mitchell may refer to:
 Jon Mitchell (meteorologist), British metereoligist 
 Jon Mitchell (journalist), Welsh journalist in Japan, author, poet
 Jon Mitchell (ice hockey), played in 2010–11 SIJHL season
 Jon Mitchell (politician), American lawyer & politician

See also
 Jonathan Mitchell (disambiguation)
 John Mitchell (disambiguation)
 Johnny Mitchell (disambiguation)